Valeri Tushentsov (born July 31, 1961 in Karagandy, Kazakh SSR, Soviet Union) is a former professional Kazakhstani ice hockey player. Valeri Tushentsov is a former head coach of Saryarka Karagandy.

Career
Valeri Tushentsov is the graduate of Karagandy ice hockey school. He started his career as a player of Stroitel Karagandy in 1993. In 1995, he invited to play in Kazakhstan National Hockey Team and played 7 games with them. In 1997, he signed a contract with Mechel Chelyabinsk and played in Russia before the end of his career.

Coaching career
2001-2002 Gazovik Tyumen - assistant coach
2004-2007 Gazovik Univer - assistant coach
2007-2008 Gazovik Tyumen - assistant coach
2008-2009 HC Saryarka - head coach

External links

1961 births
Avtomobilist Karagandy players
Bulat Temirtau players
Kazakhstani ice hockey centres
Living people
Soviet ice hockey centres
Sportspeople from Karaganda
Traktor Chelyabinsk players